Total Destruction is Unsane's second studio album, first released in Germany in 1993 through a partnership between Matador and Atlantic Records. At the time, Matador and Atlantic had a deal where at the least six albums issued by Matador must be released through Atlantic's promotion system.

To promote the album, a music video was produced for the track "Body Bomb", in which a disturbed man builds a bomb and blows up a building filled with people. The video was banned from airing on MTV.

Reception

John Bush from Allmusic called it "less compelling than the singles collection" and "too repetitive", adding that "the band has slowed down the rhythms a bit."

Track listing

Personnel

Unsane
Pete Shore – bass guitar, backing vocals
Vincent Signorelli – drums
Chris Spencer – lead vocals, guitar

Additional musicians and production
Martin Bisi – production, engineering
Simon Bodger – photography
Jens Jürgensen – cover photography
Chris Toliver – photography
Unsane – production

References

External links
 

1993 albums
Albums produced by Martin Bisi
Unsane albums